Cedric Burgers (born 16 April 1970) is a Canadian rower. He competed in the men's coxless four event at the 1992 Summer Olympics.

References

External links
 

1970 births
Living people
Canadian male rowers
Olympic rowers of Canada
Rowers at the 1992 Summer Olympics
Rowers from Vancouver